Dullatur railway station served the village of Dullatur, North Lanarkshire, Scotland from 1876 to 1967 on the Edinburgh and Glasgow Railway.

History 
The station opened on 1 March 1876 by the North British Railway. Initially there were no goods facilities but a small yard was later added to the west of the station. Dullatur West signal box, which opened with the station, was to the west. There was another signal box to the east, named Dullator East signal box, which served the sidings of Dullator Quarry and Dullator Sand Quarry. The west box closed in 1933. The station closed on 5 June 1967.

References

External links 

Disused railway stations in North Lanarkshire
Railway stations in Great Britain opened in 1842
Railway stations in Great Britain closed in 1967
Beeching closures in Scotland
Former North British Railway stations